Theo Bos (born 22 August 1983) is a Dutch former professional road and track cyclist. An Olympic silver medalist and five-time world champion, he is the brother of Olympic medalist in speed skating Jan Bos. 

On 29 November 2021, he announced his retirement of the professional cycling sport and took up the job of national track coach of the Chinese national track team.

Early life
Bos was born in Hierden, Netherlands. He has an older brother Jan Bos, who is a professional speed skater.

He went to high school in Harderwijk, where he got a havo diploma. Later he also got a vwo diploma.

In 2001, he was Junior World Champion track cycling at 1,000 m. The same year, at the age of 18, he started his professional cycling career as a senior.

Professional career

Track cycling
He won the silver medal at the 2004 Summer Olympics in the sprint event.

He won an individual gold in the sprint at the 2004 UCI Track Cycling World Championships. The following year, he won the individual sprint and a silver medal in the team sprint at the 2005 UCI Track Cycling World Championships.

At the 2006 UCI Track Cycling World Championships, Bos won the keirin and completed a career triple, having been world champion in the sprint, kilo and keirin. He won the keirin after accelerating with two laps to go, winning by a wide margin and able to raise his hands and salute the crowd as he passed the finish line. His French rival, and bronze medal winner, Arnaud Tournant, said Bos' performance was "the best I've seen in a very long time."

On 16 December 2006, Bos broke the world 200m track record during qualification rounds for the sprint at a World Cup meeting in Moscow. Bos clocked 9.772 seconds (after a computer initially had given him an unlikely 9.086 seconds) and beat the 11-year record held by Canadian Curt Harnett. Bos declared the 200m the "ultimate record" for track cyclists. Five days later Bos was elected Dutch Sportsman of the year. Bos' record was beaten by Frenchman Kévin Sireau at the Moscow Grand Prix on 29 May 2009 with 9.65 seconds.

He is in a team with Matthijs Büchli and Roy van den Berg. In 2017 Bos won the Dutch Championships in the team sprint with Büchli and van den Berg. At the 2018 UCI Track Cycling World Championships in Apeldoorn he won a bronze medal in the individual 1 km time trial.

Road cycling
On 19 April 2009, Bos was in a controversial crash in the final 800m of the final stage of the Tour of Turkey. Bos caused the crash of the eventual winner Daryl Impey by grabbing Impey's left shoulder with his right hand. Impey crashed to the left, into the barrier, next to Bos. Bos admitted pushing Impey. Bos claimed the reason for pushing Impey was because Impey was moving in on him while he was already close to the fence. Bos was disqualified and fined. On 1 May 2009 the Union Cycliste Internationale (UCI) said "Bos’s behavior undermined the image, reputation and interests of cycling". Bos was charged with an infringement and was brought before a UCI disciplinary hearing in which he was found guilty of violating UCI regulations. Bos was subsequently suspended from professional racing from 15 August through 14 September 2009.

He was touted as another addition to their sprint team. He raced in many smaller races, and some large ones including Paris–Roubaix and the Vuelta a España. When the Cervelo Test Team folded in late 2010, Bos returned to the  team. His first triumph of 2011 came in the first stage of the Tour of Oman, beating Mark Cavendish in a sprint finish.

In 2012, he won the first and last stages of the Tour of Turkey. Both of these stages saw crashes in the finale, diminishing the number of sprinters Bos had to compete against. Bos took his first win at World Tour level at the Eneco Tour. On Stage 3 from Riemst to Genk, he edged John Degenkolb on the finish line in a bunch sprint to take the victory.

Bos was originally selected as a member of the Belkin squad for the 2013 Vuelta a España, however he was withdrawn before the start of the race after tests revealed he had low cortisol levels. A team statement noted that this was "an indication of sub-optimal health conditions", and that whilst low cortisol levels were not a barrier to competing in UCI World Tour races the team's medical staff and Bos had agreed to send him home. Subsequently, Bos confirmed that his condition was due to an extreme reaction to asthma medication.

Bos rode for the Pro Continental team  in 2015 and 2016. Bos said about Team MTN-Qhubeka "The team has a great culture, I want to win and we will work together to win, our success is the success of Africa."

Following the 2015 Abu Dhabi Tour, where he did not finish stage 2, he had no further results at any major road events.

Major results

Track

2001
 1st  Kilo, UCI Juniors World Championships
2002
 UEC European Under-23 Championships
1st  Keirin
2nd Kilo
2nd Sprint
 National Championships
1st  Keirin
1st  Sprint
2003
 UEC European Under-23 Championships
1st  Kilo
1st  Sprint
2nd Keirin
 National Championships
1st  Keirin
1st  Kilo
1st  Sprint
 2nd Kilo, UCI World Cup Classics, Moscow
2004
 UCI World Championships
1st  Sprint
3rd Kilo
 National Championships
1st  Keirin
1st  Sprint
 2004 UCI World Cup Classics
1st Kilo, Moscow
2nd Kilo, Manchester
2nd Team sprint, Moscow
3rd Sprint, Moscow
 2004–05 UCI World Cup Classics, Los Angeles
1st Kilo
1st Team sprint
 2nd Sprint, Olympic Games
2005
 UCI World Championships
1st  Kilo
2nd Team sprint
 2004–05 UCI World Cup Classics, Sydney
1st Keirin
1st Sprint
 2005–06 UCI World Cup Classics, Manchester
1st Sprint
2nd Team sprint
2006
 UCI World Championships
1st  Keirin
1st  Sprint
 National Championships
1st  Keirin
1st  Sprint
 2005–06 UCI World Cup Classics, Sydney
1st Keirin
1st Team sprint
 2006–07 UCI World Cup Classics
1st Keirin, Sydney
1st Sprint, Moscow
2nd Team sprint, Sydney
2nd Team sprint, Moscow
2007
 UCI World Championships
1st  Sprint
2nd Keirin
 National Championships
1st  Keirin
1st  Sprint
 1st Masters of Sprint
 1st Rotterdam Sprint Cup
2008
 3rd Team sprint, UCI World Championships
2010
 1st  Madison, National Championships (with Peter Schep)
2011
 3rd Madison, UCI World Championships (with Peter Schep)
2012
 2nd Kilo, National Championships
2015
 National Championships
1st  Kilo
1st  Omnium
1st  Sprint
2016
 2nd Kilo, UCI World Championships
2017
 1st  Team sprint, National Championships (with Matthijs Büchli and Roy van den Berg)
 2nd Team sprint, UCI World Championships
 2nd Team sprint, 2017–18 UCI World Cup, Manchester (with Matthijs Büchli and Roy van den Berg)
2018
 2017–18 UCI World Cup, Minsk
1st Team sprint (with Matthijs Büchli and Roy van den Berg)
3rd Sprint
 2018–19 UCI World Cup
2nd Team sprint, Milton
3rd Keirin, London
3rd Kilo, Berlin
 1st  Team sprint, National Championships (with Matthijs Büchli and Roy van den Berg)
 3rd Kilo, UCI World Championships
2019
 1st Keirin, 2018–19 UCI World Cup, Hong Kong
 2nd Kilo, UCI World Championships
 2nd Kilo, UEC European Championships

Road

2009
 1st Ronde van Noord-Holland
 1st Omloop der Kempen
 Olympia's Tour
1st Prologue (TTT), Stages 1, 2 & 4
 3rd Ronde van Overijssel
 4th Beverbeek Classic
2010
 1st Clásica de Almería
 Vuelta a Castilla y León
1st  Points classification
1st Stages 1 & 2
 1st Stage 5 Vuelta a Murcia
2011
 1st Tour de Rijke
 1st Dutch Food Valley Classic
 Tour of Oman
1st Stages 1 & 3
 1st Stage 6 Danmark Rundt
 2nd Overall Delta Tour Zeeland
 6th Handzame Classic
 8th Scheldeprijs
2012
 1st Dwars door Drenthe
 1st Dutch Food Valley Classic
 1st Memorial Rik Van Steenbergen
 Tour of Turkey
1st Stages 1 & 8
 1st Stage 3 Eneco Tour
 1st Stage 2 World Ports Classic
 3rd Scheldeprijs
2013
 Tour of Hainan
1st Stages 2, 3, 4, 5, 7 & 9
 Tour de Langkawi
1st Stages 1 & 2
 1st Stage 1 Critérium International
 1st Stage 2 Volta ao Algarve
 1st Stage 2 Ster ZLM Toer
 1st Stage 3 Tour of Norway
 8th Scheldeprijs
 9th Ronde van Zeeland Seaports
2014
 1st  Overall World Ports Classic
1st  Points classification
 1st Ronde van Zeeland Seaports
 Tour de Langkawi
1st Stages 2, 7, 8 & 9
 1st Stage 3 Tour de Pologne
 1st Stage 4 Tour of Alberta
 2nd Handzame Classic
 3rd Overall Tour de l'Eurométropole
1st Stage 3

Grand Tour general classification results timeline

References

External links

 

Pictures of the Kimera
Cycling News Coverage of '09 Tour of Turkey
Crash at '09 Tour of Turkey (in slow motion)

1983 births
Living people
People from Harderwijk
Dutch male cyclists
Cyclists at the 2004 Summer Olympics
Cyclists at the 2008 Summer Olympics
Cyclists at the 2016 Summer Olympics
Olympic cyclists of the Netherlands
Olympic silver medalists for the Netherlands
UCI Track Cycling World Champions (men)
Olympic medalists in cycling
Presidential Cycling Tour of Turkey stage winners
Medalists at the 2004 Summer Olympics
Dutch cyclists at the UCI Track Cycling World Championships
Cyclists from Gelderland
21st-century Dutch people